Akhund, Iran may refer to:
Akhund, Bushehr, Iran
Akhund, Khuzestan, Iran

containing the term
Akhund Mahalleh (disambiguation)
Akhund Mahalleh, Ardabil, Iran
Akhund Mahalleh, Gilan, Iran
Akhund Mahalleh, Mazandaran, Iran
Akhund Melk, Iran
Akhund Qeshlaq, Iran
Akhundi, Iran
Mal-e Akhund, Iran

See also
Akhund (disambiguation)
Akhundzadeh, Iran